Roy Theodore Graham (11 December 1887 – 26 February 1965) was a Liberal party member of the House of Commons of Canada. He was born in Smiths Falls, Ontario and became a barrister by career.

Graham attended school at Smiths Falls, then one year at Osgoode Hall Law School.

He was elected to Parliament at the Swift Current riding in the 1940 general election then defeated in the 1945 election by Thomas John Bentley of the Co-operative Commonwealth Federation.

He was appointed a judge of the Court of King's Bench for Saskatchewan in 1949. He resigned owing to ill-health in 1960.

References

External links
 

1887 births
1965 deaths
Members of the House of Commons of Canada from Saskatchewan
Liberal Party of Canada MPs
People from Smiths Falls
Canadian King's Counsel
Canadian Expeditionary Force officers
Judges in Saskatchewan
Lawyers in Saskatchewan